Chen-Yu Liu (born 13 June 1975) is a Taiwanese physicist.

Chen earned a bachelor's degree from National Taiwan University in 1997, then a doctorate at Princeton University in 2002. After defending her dissertation, A superthermal ultra-cold neutron source, Chen completed a three-year postdoctoral research fellowship at Los Alamos National Laboratory. She began teaching at Indiana University Bloomington in 2005, and was appointed the James H. Rudy Professor of Physics. She received a Sloan Research Fellowship in 2007, and was elected a fellow of the American Physical Society in 2018, for her research into experimental nuclear physics.

References

1975 births
Living people
Taiwanese women physicists
21st-century Taiwanese physicists
21st-century physicists
Indiana University Bloomington faculty
National Taiwan University alumni
Princeton University alumni
Taiwanese expatriates in the United States
Sloan Research Fellows
Fellows of the American Physical Society